Ron Digney (28 February 1932 – 5 October 2009) was an  Australian rules footballer who played with South Melbourne in the Victorian Football League (VFL).

Family

Grandson - Campbell Miller

Notes

External links 

1932 births
2009 deaths
Australian rules footballers from Victoria (Australia)
Sydney Swans players